Spodnja Kapla is a dispersed settlement in the hills north of the Drava River in the Municipality of Podvelka in Slovenia, close to the border with Austria.

Name
The name Spodnja Kapla literally means 'lower Kapla', distinguishing the settlement from neighboring Zgornja Kapla (literally, 'upper Kapla'). Like other settlements named Kapla (e.g., Kapla in the Municipality of Tabor) and similar names (e.g., Kaplja vas, Kapljišče, and Železna Kapla in Austria), the name is derived from the Slovene common noun *kapla 'chapel' (< *kapela < MHG and OHG kappella < Latin cappella 'chapel'), referring to a local religious structure.

Mass graves
Spodnja Kapla is the site of three known mass graves or unmarked graves associated with the Second World War. They all contain the remains of victims murdered in May 1945 by the Jože Lacko Detachment of the Partisan forces. The Četrtnik Cross Mass Grave is located at the Četrtnik farm in the southern part of the settlement. It contains the remains of a family of five from Ruše that was murdered because the head of the family was suspected of being an informant. It contains the remains six people murdered on suspicion of being informants. It contains the remains of an Austrian murdered on suspicion of being an informant.

Notable people
 Zinka Zorko (1936–2019), linguist and academic

References

External links
Spodnja Kapla on Geopedia

Populated places in the Municipality of Podvelka